Putnam County Bridge No. 159, also known as the Reelsville Bridge, is a historic Open spandrel bridge located in Washington Township, Putnam County, Indiana. It was designed by noted bridge architect Daniel B. Luten and built in 1929, and replaced an earlier truss and covered bridge.  It measures 171 feet, 6 inches, long and consists of five reinforced concrete approaches and a 120 feet, 6 inch, open spandrel span at the center.

It was listed on the National Register of Historic Places in 1999.

References

Road bridges on the National Register of Historic Places in Indiana
Bridges completed in 1929
Transportation buildings and structures in Putnam County, Indiana
National Register of Historic Places in Putnam County, Indiana
Concrete bridges in the United States
Open-spandrel deck arch bridges in the United States